AGI-Plan was a memory resident DOS file infector first isolated at the Agiplan software company in Germany.  Because of CARO standards that dictate that viruses should not be named after companies, AGI-Plan's technical name is Month 4–6.  This name also violates CARO standards, but a more minor rule involving syntax.  AGI-Plan is related to the Zero Bug virus, as both it and AGI-Plan prepend 1,536 bytes to files they infect.

AGI-Plan is not initially damaging until several months after the initial infection, hence its name.  After activation, AGI-Plan will begin to corrupt write operations, which results in slow, difficult-to-notice damage over time.

AGI-Plan is notable for reappearing in South Africa in what appeared to be an intentional re-release several years after.  AGI-Plan never succeeded in spreading significantly beyond the isolated incidents in Germany and South Africa.

References

External links 
Month 4-6, by F-Secure

DOS file viruses